Hungarian-Romanian relations are foreign relations between Hungary and Romania. Relations between the two nations date back to the Middle Ages, including Wallachia and Moldavia. Modern diplomatic relations between the two states date back to Romanian unification in 1859 and independence in 1877.

Both countries share  of common border. Both nations are full members of NATO and of the European Union. However, there are historical nationalist tensions over Transylvania.

Bilateral relations
Romania's ethnic Hungarian party also participated in all the government coalitions between 1996 and 2008 and from 2009. In 1996, Romania signed and ratified a basic bilateral treaty with Hungary that settled outstanding disagreements, laying the foundation for closer, more cooperative relations.

Economic relations
In 2012, the total amount of international trade between Romania and Hungary was 7.3 billion euro, of which exports from Romania were 2.4 billion euro, whereas exports from Hungary were 4.9 billion euro. Hungary ranks as the third of Romania's trade partners, after Germany and Italy.

MOL Group and OTP Bank, two of Hungary's largest companies, are present in Romania since 2003 and 2004 respectively. MOL Group operates (as of August 2013) a network of 138 fuel stations in Romania, which accounts for approximately 10 percent of the total network. OTP Bank has a widespread network of branches in Romania, with presence in every county.

Wizz Air is a low-cost airline from Hungary, which operates flights from several airports in Romania (Bucharest, Cluj-Napoca, Târgu Mureș, Sibiu, Timișoara, Iasi, Suceava and Craiova) to various destinations in Europe. It is the largest low-cost airline operating in Romania, and in 2013 it carried 3.2 million passengers on its over 72 local routes.

RCS & RDS, Romania's leading company in internet and cable and satellite television services, is arguably the second or third company on the television market in Hungary, with (as of August 2013) around 22.4 percent of market share.

Hungary → Romania

Most important Hungarian investors in Romania: MOL, OTP Bank, Gedeon Richter Plc.

Most important Romanian investors in Hungary: RCS & RDS, Automobile Dacia.

Conflict

Thinking about Dacia, Romanians consider it the old territory of their ancestors before any Huns arrived in Europe. The ancient Kingdom of Dacia was established and documented starting in 168 BC. In regards to Hungary, there is disagreement over Transylvania, which Romanians believe is claimed to be Hungarian by Hungarians, despite prehistoric records of Geto-Dacians  suggesting otherwise.
Under Attila, the Huns did conquer Transylvania in 376 who kept it until the death of Attila in 453. Later, the territory was periodically occupied and exploited by the Huns.

Despite having a mostly positive relationship, many Hungarians believe that Romania does not deserve the current territory of Transylvania, because Transylvania was also an integral part of the Kingdom of Hungary (1000-1526, 1848-1849, 1867-1920) and the Lands of the Hungarian Crown (Eastern Hungarian Kingdom (1526-1570), Principality of Transylvania (1570-1867)) until the Treaty of Trianon.

World War I

During the war, initially the Kingdom of Romania was neutral to the Central Powers, thus with Austria-Hungary. In August 1916  Romania entered the war on side of the Allies and attacked the Kingdom of Hungary, however it was pushed back to the frontier in October and by January 1917, two-thirds of Romania were occupied by the Central Powers. The Romanians were forced to retreat to the historical region of Moldavia, but were able to stave off complete collapse in 1917 by reorganizing their army and repulsing the Central Powers' offensive at Mărășești and Oituz. Nevertheless, after the October Revolution of 1917, Russia fell into civil war, and the Russian government signed two ceasefire agreements with the Central Powers, followed later (on December 15) by a full armistice. Lacking Russian support, the Romanian government was subsequently forced to sue for peace, concluding in December 1917 the Armistice of Focșani.

Hungarian–Romanian War

In 1918, Romania re-entered the war with similar objectives to those of 1916. During the 1919 Hungarian–Romanian War Hungary, led by Communist forces, tried to secure its borders, however it was soon defeated and later occupied by Romanian forces.

Treaty of Trianon

The Treaty of Trianon was the peace agreement of 1920 that formally ended World War I between most of the Allies (among them the Kingdom of Romania) and the Kingdom of Hungary, the latter being one of the successor states to Austria-Hungary. As a result of the treaty the regions of Transylvania, parts of the Banat, Crișana and Maramureș became part of the Kingdom of Romania.

Interwar period and World War II

The Treaty of Trianon and its consequences dominated Hungarian public life and political culture in the inter-war period. Moreover, the Hungarian government swung then more and more to the right; eventually, under Regent Miklós Horthy, Hungary established close relations with Benito Mussolini's Fascist Italy and Adolf Hitler's Nazi Germany. These politics and the sought for revision succeeded to regain the territories of southern Czechoslovakia by the First Vienna Award in 1938 and the annexation of the remainder of Subcarpathia in 1939. These were only a fraction of the territories lost by the Treaty of Trianon, anyway the loss that the Hungarians resented the most was that of Transylvania ceded to the Romanians.

In 1940, the Soviet occupation of Bessarabia and Northern Bukovina inspired Hungary to escalate its efforts to resolve "the question of Transylvania". Hungary hoped to gain as much of Transylvania as possible, but the Romanians submitted only a small region for consideration. Eventually, the Hungarian-Romanian negotiations fell through entirely. After this, the Romanian government asked Italy and Germany to arbitrate.

In 1940, ethnic disturbances between Hungarians and Romanians continued after some incidents following the occupation of Northern Transylvania by the Hungarian military, culminating in massacres at Treznea and Ip. After some ethnic Hungarian groups considered unreliable or insecure were sacked/expelled from Southern Transylvania, the Hungarian officials also regularly expelled some Romanian groups from Northern Transylvania. Also, many Hungarians and Romanians fled or chose to opt between the two countries. There was a mass exodus; over 100,000 people on both sides of the ethnic and political borders relocated.

During World War II, Hungary and Romania became allies and participated in the war against the Soviet Union. But after the coup on 23 August 1944 Romania switched sides and fought against Hungary. Consequently, Soviet and Romanian troops invaded Hungary, occupied Northern Transylvania by October 1944 and re-established the Romanian administration in the region in March 1945. The 1947 Treaty of Paris reaffirmed the borders between Romania and Hungary as originally defined in Treaty of Trianon 27 years earlier, thus confirming the return of Northern Transylvania to Romania.

Post-Cold War Era
Soon after the demise of the Communist regimes in Hungary and Romania, in March 1990, violent ethnic clashes in Transylvania strained the relationship between both countries to the brink of war. As a result, the first Open Skies Treaty in the world to mutually assess the strength and disposition of opposing military forces was worked out and became effective in 1992. This is considered a direct precursor of the 2002 multilateral Treaty on Open Skies that once included Russia and the United States.

Hungary and Romania are NATO allies and members of the European Union. However, nationalist tension persists.

Resident diplomatic missions
 Hungary has an embassy in Bucharest, consulates-general in Cluj-Napoca and Miercurea Ciuc, and honorary consulates in Timișoara, Iași, Constanța and Drobeta-Turnu Severin
 Romania has an embassy in Budapest and has consulates-general in Gyula and Szeged.

See also 
 Foreign relations of Hungary 
 Foreign relations of Romania
 Hungarians in Romania
 Romanians in Hungary
 Hungary–Romania football rivalry
 Transylvanianism
 Union of Hungary and Romania
 2004 enlargement of the European Union 
 2007 enlargement of the European Union

References

 
Romania
Bilateral relations of Romania